Dundonald may refer to:

Places

Canada
 Dundonald, Ontario, Cramahe
 Dundonald, Saskatoon, Saskatchewan
 Dundonald Park, in Ottawa

South Africa
 Dundonald, Mpumalanga

United Kingdom
 Dundonald, County Down, Northern Ireland
 Dundonald railway station
 Dundonald, County Antrim, a townland in Northern Ireland
 Dundonald, Fife, Cardenden, Scotland
 Dundonald, South Ayrshire, Scotland
 Dundonald Castle
 RAF Dundonald
 Dundonald Castle, Kintyre, Argyll and Bute, Scotland
 Dundonald House, Belfast, Northern Ireland
 Dundonald Church, London, England

Other uses 
 Dundonald (ship), a ship wrecked off Disappointment Island in 1907
 Earl of Dundonald, a title in the peerage of Scotland

See also
 Dundonald Bluebell F.C., a football club in Fife, Scotland